Vajda is a Hungarian language surname. It is derived from Proto-Slavic *vojevoda. In medieval times, vajda was the equivalent of voivode, meaning a "war-leader" or "war-lord". The name may refer to:
Anna Vajda (born 1984), Hungarian basketball player 
Árpád Vajda (1896–1967), Hungarian chess player
Attila Vajda (born 1983), Hungarian athlete
Edward Vajda (born 1958), American linguist
Ernest Vajda (1886–1954), Hungarian actor
Géza Vajda (born 1950), Hungarian orienteer
Gregory Vajda (born 1973), Hungarian musician
György Mihály Vajda (born 1935), Hungarian philosopher
János Vajda (poet) (1827–1897), Hungarian poet
János Vajda (composer) (born 1949), Hungarian composer
Jaroslav Vajda (1919–2008), American hymn composer
Ladislao Vajda (1906–1965), Hungarian film director
Ladislaus Vajda (1878–1933), Hungarian screenwriter
Lajos Vajda (1908–1941), Hungarian painter
Levente Vajda (born 1981), Romanian chess grandmaster
Marián Vajda (born 1965), Slovak tennis player
Patrik Vajda (born 1989), Slovak football player
Steven Vajda (1901–1995), Hungarian mathematician
Szidonia Vajda (born 1979), Romanian chess player
Vivi Vajda, Swedish paleontologist

See also
 
Wajda

Hungarian-language surnames
Slavic-language surnames